José María Lozano (29 October 1878 – 17 August 1933) was a Mexican lawyer and conservative politician who briefly served as Secretary of Public Instruction and Fine Arts and Secretary of Commerce and Public Works in the cabinet of Victoriano Huerta, the army general who assumed control of the country following a coup d'état against the democratically elected president, Francisco I. Madero.

Before assuming his post in the cabinet, Lozano served as federal congressman in the Chamber of Deputies, where he led a group of conservative Anti-Maderistas along fellow deputies Nemesio García Naranjo of Nuevo León, Francisco de Olaguíbel of State of Mexico, and Querido Moheno of Chiapas. At Huerta's request, he also tried to build a legislative majority sympathetic to his regime.

Books
 (1956)
 (1960)

See also
1913 Coup d'état in Mexico

References

Mexican Secretaries of Education
Mexican Secretaries of Communications and Transportation
Members of the Chamber of Deputies (Mexico)
Presidents of the Chamber of Deputies (Mexico)
Politicians from Jalisco
1878 births
1933 deaths